The Heron River is a river of Stewart Island/Rakiura, New Zealand. It rises north of Adventure Hill and flows south-eastward into Port Adventure.

See also
List of rivers of New Zealand

References

Rivers of Stewart Island